Lotoshino is an urban locality (an urban-type settlement) and the administrative center of Lotoshinsky District of Moscow Oblast, Russia. It is the least populous administrative center of a district in Moscow Oblast. Population: 

Lotoshino was first mentioned in a chronicle in 1478. Under the Russian Empire, it was a village within Volokolamsky Uyezd of Moscow Governorate, but did not even have a status of a volost center. It became the administrative center of the district in 1929, when Moscow Oblast was founded. In 1951, it was granted urban-type settlement status.

Postal codes: 143800, 143801.

References

Urban-type settlements in Moscow Oblast
Staritsky Uyezd